Tharangini Records (currently Tharangni) is the music company founded by noted Indian Playback singer K. J. Yesudas in 1980 at Thiruvananthapuram, Kerala. It was  the first recording and distributing music label in Kerala from where Malayalam film songs on audio cassettes came out. Other than Malayalam, Tharangni also released songs in Tamil, Telugu, Kannada, Hindi, Bengali, Marathi, English, Malay, Arabic, Russian and Latin. Tharangni release albums under various labels, Tharangni (film songs), Tharangni or Ayaan (album/devotional songs), Bharath Sangeeth (Classical songs and Hindi albums), 9th Angel Records (Christian devotional songs), Diva Records, V Records & Entertainment, Amplify More, all licensed or incorporated under Dr. K. J. Yesudass Audio and Visuals Corporation Limited and Yesudass Media Private Limited.

Tharangini cassettes popularise light music and mappila songs among the audiences. Light music albums like Vasantha Geethangal, Raaga Tharangini, Madhura Geethangal etc. which also includes festival albums like Ulsava Ganangal series, Ponnona Tharangini series and mappila songs' albums like Mylanchi Pattukal series, Jannatul Firdaus were huge popular. Shyama dharaniyil from the 1981 Malayalam movie Sanchari was the first recorded song in Tharangini studio, which was composed and sung by Yesudas. In December 1981, Tharangini released its first audio cassette, Classical Music Vol-1. The first filmi songs' audio cassette released by Tharangini was from the movie Chillu.

History
The company started its functioning in its first studio at Vellayambalam, Thiruvananthapuram as Tharangini Studios and Records on 23 November 1980. It also had a studio at Ernakulam. The studio had state-of-the-art Otari eight-track tape machine and a two-track mastering system from Switzerland. Recordings were done at Thiruvananthapuram studio till 2005.
In 1992 the office and studio were moved to Abhiramapuram, Chennai, Tamil Nadu due to labor strike. It also started a voice mixing studio, Studio27, at Chennai. The company was incorporated at the United States in 1998.

Profile
Primarily established as the first recording and distributing music label in Kerala for Malayalam films, it has in its credit number of audio albums mainly associated with K. J. Yesudas. A. Karunakaran was the chief mixing engineer of the studio between 1985 and 2005. Composer Alleppey Ranganath joined Tharangini as staff music director and script scrutinising officer in 1981. Satheesh Sathyan, son of actor Sathyan, was the manager of Tharangini from 1982 to 1986. Sound designer Renganaath Ravee was also worked as a sound recordist here.
The cassettes (the primary medium for music before digital revolution), produced by Tharangini, containing light songs, used to be sold just as those featuring film songs in the 1980s and 90s. Tharangini paved way for the most melodious period for non-film music in Malayalam. Now it continues to produce and present events of K. J. Yesudas both for film and Indian classical music concerts throughout the world. Most of Tharangini's cassette covers features the snaps clicked by photographer R. Gopalakrishnan.

Releases

Festival releases
During 1980s and 90s, songs like Shraavana chandrika, Valamipiri shankhil, Ennum chirikkunna, Maamaankam palakuri etc. were brought out by Tharangini Records and became best-sellers. “More than 5 lakh cassettes of 'Ulsava Ganangal Vol. 1' were sold shortly after Tharangini released it in 1983,” recalls Sreekumaran Thampi, who wrote all the songs of the album. Ennum chirikkunna, from  the album composed by Raveendran, remains one of the greatest light songs of all time in Malayalam. Composer Sreevalsan J. Menon used to sing it as a student. “It is an astonishing composition; it certainly is not easy to tune such a song in raga Mohanam”, he says. Uthradapoonilave vaa, another track from the album, gained huge popularity among Keralites.
Soon Tharangini brought out two other winners, 'Ganolsavam' and 'Vasantha Geethangal'. 'Ganolsavam' contained Shraavana chandrika, penned by O. N. V. Kurup, composed by Jerry Amaldev and rendered by Yesudas, "is one of the finest songs in Malayalam on night and its irresistible beauty". The highlight of 'Vasantha Geethangal', written by Bichu Thirumala and composed by Raveendran, was Valampiri shankhil and "it had Yesudas at his best. It is the golden standard of singing", says Sreevalsan.

Tharangini was the first studio or label to release a set of songs every year for Onam. “The first album that came under the label ‘Onappattukal Vol. 1’ was released in 1981. It had songs, written by O. N. V. Kurup and composed by Alleppey Ranganath, all sung by Yesudas himself. It was an Onam gift from the maestro,” says music critic T. P. Sasthamangalam. "One of the evergreen albums from Tharangini was 'Ulsava Ganangal Vol. 1', which had Sreekumaran Thampi writing the lines for Raveendran’s music and sung by Yesudas. Uthradapoonilave vaa, Ennum chirikkunna sooryante, Paayippaattaattil vallamkali and Oru nullu kaakkapoo were immortal songs in this collection. Every year, this album of Onam songs, written and composed by great lyricists and music directors, was much awaited by music lovers. In 1986, 'Aavanippookkal’ was a record-breaking album that had lyricist Yusufali Kechery teaming up with composer M. S. Viswanathan", adds the critic. Yesudas occasionally sings the song Thulasi krishnathulasi from 'Aavanippookkal' towards the end of his classical concerts. The eleven songs written by Yusufali Kechery and composed by Vidyadharan for the album 'Raaga Tharangini' turned superhits, among which the songs Amavaasi naalil and Ninmeni nenmeni vaakapoovo become classics.

Devotional releases

Tharangini released devotional songs on various religious occasions each year. 'Ganga Theertham', 'Thulasi Theertham' and 'Mayilpeeli' were such albums which became biggest hits in devotional cassette sales.
Mappila songs, including folk and devotional, were confined to certain Muslim pockets in the Malabar region, but with the arrival of V. M. Kutty and his female singing partner Valsala, these songs gained popularity, especially after Yesudas sung one of his numbers Samkritha Pamagari for the album 'Mylanchi Pattukal Vol. 1'. Rakshaka ente paapabhaaramellaam, written by P. K. Gopi and composed by Tomin J. Thachankary, from the Christian devotional album 'Vachanam' gained huge popularity after it was released by Tharangini (later released under Thachankary's own label Riyan Creations).

List of Tharangini Music artists
 K. J. Yesudas
 S. Janaki
 K. S. Chithra
 Sujatha Mohan
 Vilayil Fazeela
 S. Janakidevi
 Vijay Yesudas

Selected film albums
 Chillu
 Ente Mamattukkuttiyammakku
 Nakhakshathangal
 Panchagni
 Thalavattam
 Daisy
 Isabella
 Ennennum Kannettante
 Namukku Parkkan Munthirithoppukal
 Manivathoorile Aayiram Sivarathrikal
 Neeyethra Dhanya
 Nadodikkattu
 Thoovanathumbikal
 Unnikale Oru Kadha Parayam
 Dhwani
 Njan Gandharvan
 His Highness Abdullah
 Bharatham
 Pappayude Swantham Appoos
 Yoddha
 Sargam
 Ghazal

Selected discography
 Ayyappa Bhakthi Gaanangal (Vol 1 – 37)
 Grameena Ganangal (Vol 1, 2)
 Ulsava Ganangal (Vol 1 - 3)
 Vishada Ganangal (Vol 1, 2)
 Mylanchi Pattukal (Vol 1 - 5)
 Sweet Melodies (Vol 1 - 5)
 Ganga Theertham (Vol 1, 2)
 Thulasi Maala (Vol 1, 2)
 Ponnona Tharangini (Vol 1 - 4)
 Rasikapriya (Vol 1, 2)
 Thalir Malyam (1979)
 Onappattukal (1981)
 Mappila Pattukal (1982)
 Children's Songs (Vol 1, 2)
 Vasantha Geethangal (1984)
 Ganolsavam (1984)
 Bhava Geethangal (1984)
 Prabhatha Geethangal (1984)
 Gaanamalika (1984)
 Parishudha Ganangal (1984)
 Ayyappa Suprabhatham (1984)
 Snehamalyam (1985)
 Amrutha Geethangal (1986)
 Aavani Pookkal (1986)
 Ragatharangini (1987)
 Vellipparavakal (1987)
 Aavani Thennal (1988)
 Aavani Pookkuda (1988)
 Snehadeepika (1989)
 Aavani Poochendu (1989)
 Sri Mookambikai Songs (1989) 
 Thulasi Theertham (1986)
 Aavani Thaalam (1991)
 Pavizhamalli (1992)
 Aardra Geethangal (1993)
 Hrudayanjali (1993)
 Mayilpeeli (1988)
 Om Gananaadham (1997)
 Anuraga Manjari (1994)
 Snehageethangal (1995)
 Pranavam (1997)
 Om Mahaganapathe (1995)
 Pradakshinam (1996)
 Vinayakam (1996)
 Shravana Sangeetham (1996)
 Aavani Ponpulari (1997)
 Lailathul Khadar (1997)
 Thiruvona Kaineettam (1998)
 Harimurali (1998)
 Astotharam (1998)
 Poothiruvonam (1999)
 Kasthoori Thilakam (2000)
 Namaarchana (2000)
 Ennum Ee Ponnonam (2001)
 Kodi Archana (2001)
 Pushpolsavam (2001)
 Sree Chakkulathamma (2000)
 Swami Suprabhatham (2001)
 Ormikkan Omanikkan (2002)
 Rudra Theertham (2002)
 Souparnika Theertham (2002)
 Kudamullappoo (2003)
 Agrepashyami (2003) 
 Vande Mukundam (2003) - Collaborated with Satyam Audios
 Rithu Geethangal (2004) - Collaborated with Satyam Audios
 Geetha Pranamam (2004)
 Nadhi (2004)
 Navaganapathy (2004)
 Swargappoovu (2004)
 Kusruthi Kannan (2006)
 Neelambari (2007)
 Maaleyam (2007)
 Thirumudippeeli (2012)
 Ambalapuzhakannanu Paalpayasam (2013)
 Ammathamburatti (2013)

See also
K. J. Yesudas
K. J. Yesudas discography

References

External links
 
 

Official website
Tharangni - Bandcamp

K. J. Yesudas
Indian record labels
Record labels established in 1980
Record label distributors
Indian music record labels